Iisak Mylläri (15 December 1894 – 23 October 1967) was a Finnish wrestler. He competed in the freestyle light heavyweight event at the 1924 Summer Olympics.

References

1894 births
1967 deaths
Olympic wrestlers of Finland
Wrestlers at the 1924 Summer Olympics
Finnish male sport wrestlers
Sportspeople from Saint Petersburg